Ovidiu Vezan (born 20 March 1985) is a Romanian professional footballer who plays as an attacking midfielder for Liga III side Gloria Lunca Teuz Cermei.

References

External links
 
 

1985 births
Living people
People from Ineu
Romanian footballers
Association football midfielders
Liga I players
Liga II players
FC UTA Arad players
CS ACU Arad players
CSM Jiul Petroșani players
CS Minerul Lupeni players
FC Internațional Curtea de Argeș players
AFC Săgeata Năvodari players
LPS HD Clinceni players
CS Unirea Sânnicolau Mare players
FC Delta Dobrogea Tulcea players
FCV Farul Constanța players
ACS Viitorul Târgu Jiu players